The Granit oak (in Bulgarian: Гранитски дъб) is an English (Pedunculate) oak tree that grows within the boundaries of Granit village, Bulgaria.

The oak measures 2.38 m in diameter and 7.46 m in girth at waist level and reaches 23.4 m in height, but only eastern side branches remain alive. In March 1982 samples were taken with a pressler drill, from which it was estimated that the tree was 1637 years old. With an estimated germination date of 345 AD, it is the oldest tree in Bulgaria and one of the oldest in Europe.

In 1967 the Granit oak was declared a protected tree and included in the list of  the natural monuments of Bulgaria.

In 2010 the oak was featured prominently in a documentary Live Eternity (in Bulgarian: Жива Вечност).

See also 
Baikushev's Pine
List of individual trees
List of oldest trees

References

Gallery 

Individual oak trees
Stara Zagora Province
Individual trees in Bulgaria
Oldest trees